Danielle Balbuena (born June 13, 1997), better known by her stage name 070 Shake, is an American rapper and singer. Aside from her solo career, she is also a member of the musical collective 070, who have released a mixtape together titled The 070 Project: Chapter 1 (2016). Shake released her solo debut EP, Glitter, in March 2018.

In 2018, she gained attention for her involvement with American rapper Kanye West's production work in Wyoming, with West later signing her to his GOOD Music imprint. Shake went on to make uncredited appearances on the songs "Ghost Town" and "Violent Crimes" from West's Ye, both of which reached the top 40 on the Billboard Hot 100 chart. Shake also made appearances on Pusha T's Daytona and Nas' Nasir. Her debut album Modus Vivendi (2020), and its follow-up, You Can't Kill Me (2022), were both positively received by music critics. 

In 2022, she was featured on the single "Escapism" by singer Raye, which reached number 22 on the Hot 100 and number one in the United Kingdom.

Early life
Balbuena was born in North Bergen, New Jersey, and is of Dominican descent. Balbuena attended North Bergen High School, where she played on the school's basketball team. Prior to her music career, Balbuena wrote poetry.

Career

2015–2016: Early years 
Shake began her music career in late 2015, recording the songs "Proud" and "Swervin". Shake's stage name is derived from her affiliation with the 070 music collective; 070 coming from New Jersey's 070 ZIP Codes. By 2018, the 070 crew was noted to have 11 members including artists and producers.

By 2016, Shake was earning hundreds of thousands of streams on SoundCloud. Soon after posting several songs on SoundCloud, Shake attracted the attention of Miami-based promoter and social media personality YesJulz. After hearing "Proud" specifically, YesJulz reached out to Shake on Twitter, quickly signing on to be her manager. Shake broke through with "Trust Nobody", released early in that year. In August, Shake collaborated with fellow 070 members Ralphy River, Hack, and Treee Safari on the single "Honey". The song featured production from frequent collaborators The Kompetition, a three-person production group. "Honey" simultaneously premiered on Complex and 1 AM Radio on Dash. Vibe commented that the track "[sounded] tailor made to rock on dance floors everywhere."

Also in 2016, Shake signed with Kanye West's GOOD Music label. GOOD Music found out about Shake through Julz, as she played some of Shake's music at a Yeezy fitting, interesting the label's president, Pusha T. After signing Shake, the label picked up her "Trust Nobody" track and re-released it in September. Shake spent October and November opening up for English rock band The 1975 during the American leg of their 2016 tour. On December 8, 070 released their first mixtape, The 070 Project: Chapter 1.

2017–present: Glitter, Modus Vivendi and You Can't Kill Me
Shake modeled for Gypsy Sport's Fall 2017 runway show. She also went on her first headlining tour in April. In a 2017 interview with Paper, Shake mentioned her Yellow Girl EP would release later that year. However, the project was moved back to release after Glitter, another collaboration with The Kompetition.

Her solo debut, the 6-track EP Glitter was released on March 23, 2018, although it was originally slated for a January 26 release and to include 12 tracks. At the time of Glitters release, media outlets noted that her lyrical content concentrated on her self-esteem issues, drug use, and sexuality. Shake described Glitter as "about being in a dark place and finding yourself and figuring it out. It's about being in the lowest of lows type of shit." Shortly prior to Glitters release, Shake performed at the SXSW music festival.

In May, Shake was featured on "Santeria", a track from Pusha T's album Daytona. Shake also had featured vocals on "Ghost Town" and "Violent Crimes" from Kanye West's album Ye.

Michael Saponara praised the two tracks as "standout cuts" on the album, and ranked "Ghost Town" specifically as the album's best song. HotNewHipHop praised Shake's performance on "Ghost Town" as the highlight of the song, and called the track the climax of the album. Shake told Pigeons & Planes that "Ghost Town" was nearly left off Ye, as the track was finished on the same day of the album's release. "Ghost Town" also featured vocals from Kid Cudi, another inspiration of Shake's; she shared with Pigeons & Planes, "All my life I grew up listening to Kanye West and Kid Cudi. I've cried to their music. They've definitely changed my life, and saved me from a lot of stuff." Shake's recording experience with West in Wyoming for his album Ye impacted her thoughts about Yellow Girl; she stated "I don't know if it's going to be called Yellow Girl. I know the songs are definitely changing. The experience I had in Wyoming makes me want to make music on a different level."

In 2019, she featured on DJ Khaled's album Father of Asahd alongside Buju Banton, Sizzla and Mavado on the song "Holy Mountain".

Shake released her debut album, Modus Vivendi, on January 17, 2020. Her second studio album, You Can't Kill Me was released in June 2022. Its first single, "Lose My Cool" featuring NLE Choppa, was released on December 3, 2021.

In the summer of 2022, Shake accompanied American rapper Kid Cudi on his To the Moon World Tour as an opening act. In October 2022, Shake was featured on the song "Escapism" by Raye. After going viral on TikTok, the song charted internationally and became Shake's first song to chart on the Billboard Hot 100.

Artistry 
Her musical style has been described as pop, alternative, ambient, and hip-hop. Shake has cited Michael Jackson, Lauryn Hill, Paramore, and My Chemical Romance as the artists who've inspired her music.

Personal life 
Prominently referenced in her music, Shake uses she/her pronouns when describing lovers. A 2017 Vogue essay on rising queer stars in rap music mentioned Shake being in a relationship with Sophia Diana Lodato. In a 2018 Pitchfork article, Shake said she doesn't like to put labels on her sexuality. "I don't really identify myself as queer or gay or anything. I just like girls." She was in a relationship with singer Kehlani.

Discography

Studio albums

Extended plays

Mixtapes

Instrumental albums

Singles

As lead artist

As featured artist

Other charted songs

Guest appearances

Filmography

Television

Promotion 

Her single "Morrow" is featured in EA Sports's FIFA 21.

The song "Glitter" from the EP of the same name is featured in the Netflix series On My Block, season 2 episode 1.

The song "Lose My Cool" feat. NLE Choppa is featured on NBA 2K22.

The song "The Pines" from Modus Vivendi (2020) is featured in the Netflix series Inventing Anna (2022).

Concert tours

Headlining

Supporting
 Kid Cudi – To the Moon Tour (2022)
 Coldplay – Music of the Spheres World Tour (2023)

References

Further reading

External links 
 
 070 Shake Agency

1997 births
Living people
21st-century American rappers
21st-century American LGBT people
Alternative hip hop musicians
American women hip hop singers
American women singer-songwriters
GOOD Music artists
LGBT people from New Jersey
LGBT rappers
North Bergen High School alumni
People from North Bergen, New Jersey
Rappers from New Jersey
Singer-songwriters from New Jersey
21st-century American women singers
21st-century American singers
Def Jam Recordings artists
21st-century women rappers